The 2011 Chivas USA season was the club's seventh year of existence, as well as their seventh season in Major League Soccer, and their seventh consecutive season in the top-flight of American soccer.

Overview

February
Chivas USA signed New Zealand internationals Andrew Boyens and Simon Elliott on February 9. Six days later the club acquired U.S. defender Heath Pearce from FC Dallas in exchange for allocation money.

Allocation ranking 
Chivas USA is in the #1 position in the MLS Allocation Ranking. The allocation ranking is the mechanism used to determine which MLS club has first priority to acquire a U.S. National Team player who signs with MLS after playing abroad, or a former MLS player who returns to the league after having gone to a club abroad for a transfer fee. A ranking can be traded, provided that part of the compensation received in return is another club's ranking.

International roster spots 
It is believed that Chivas USA possesses 8 international roster spots. Each club in Major League Soccer is allocated 8 international roster spots, which can be traded. Chivas USA dealt one slot to Vancouver Whitecaps on 24 November 2010 for use in the 2011 season. The club also permanently acquired one spot in a trade with Real Salt Lake on 24 November 2004. There is no limit on the number of international slots on each club's roster. The remaining roster slots must belong to domestic players. For clubs based in the United States, a domestic player is either a U.S. citizen, a permanent resident (green card holder) or the holder of other special status (e.g., refugee or asylum status).

Transfers

In

Out

1 Bornstein was selected by Portland in the expansion draft.  He then moved to  Tigres on a free transfer when his contract expired on 1 January 2011.

Future draft pick trades

Roster

Management

Kits

Competitions

MLS

League table

Results summary

Results

U.S. Open Cup

Statistics

Appearances and goals

|-
|colspan="14"|Players away from Chivas USA on loan:

|-
|colspan="14"|Players who left Chivas USA during the season:

|}

Goal scorers

Disciplinary Record

References

Chivas USA seasons
Chivas USA
Chivas USA
Chivas USA